The Great Lakes Forestry Centre is a federal forestry research institute in Sault Ste. Marie, Ontario, Canada.

Natural Resources Canada
Sault Ste. Marie, Ontario
Forest research institutes
Forestry in Canada